Shocker (also known as Wes Craven's Shocker) is a 1989 American black comedy slasher film written and directed by Wes Craven, and starring Michael Murphy, Peter Berg, Cami Cooper, and Mitch Pileggi. The film was released by Universal Pictures on October 27, 1989, and grossed $16.6 million.

Plot
A news report shows a victim being pulled away on a stretcher. It is revealed that a serial killer, having murdered over thirty people, is on the loose in a Los Angeles suburb. A television repairman with a pronounced limp, named Horace Pinker, becomes the prime suspect. When the investigating detective, Lt. Don Parker, gets too close, Pinker murders Parker's wife, foster daughter, and foster son.

However, his other foster son, a college football star named Jonathan, develops a strange connection to Pinker through his dreams and leads Parker to Pinker's run-down shop. In a shootout in which several officers are killed, Pinker escapes and targets Jonathan's girlfriend Alison in retribution, killing her as a "birthday present" while he is at practice.

Another dream leads Lt. Parker and the police to Pinker, whom they catch in the act of a kidnapping. This time, just as Pinker is about to kill Jonathan, he is arrested. Pinker is quickly convicted and sentenced to die in the electric chair.

Prior to his execution, Pinker reveals that Jonathan is, in fact, his son, and that as a boy, Jonathan had shot him in the knee while trying to stop the murder of his mother. But what they do not realize is that Pinker has made a deal with the Devil. When executed, he does not die but instead becomes pure electricity. He is able to possess others to continue his murderous ways. Some of the people who are killed are prison staff and Jonathan's friends.

He soon possesses Lt. Parker, who uses his strength to fight off Pinker, and Pinker escapes into a TV dish. Jonathan and his friends try to find a way to fight him. Jonathan's friends, including Rhino, head to the power station to disable the power.

Jonathan, with the aid of Alison's "spirit", devises a scheme to bring Pinker back into the real world and accidentally discovers that Pinker, as with all energy sources, is bound by the laws of the real world; Jonathan uses this limitation to defeat Pinker, and traps him inside a television. Pinker threatens Jonathan that he will find a way out of his "prison". Alison's voice tells Jonathan to take care of himself, while Jonathan's neighborhood suffers a blackout, caused by his friends blowing out the power main, trapping Pinker in the television. Jonathan goes outside amid all his neighbors and looks up at the sky, agreeing with Alison that they are beautiful.

Cast
 Michael Murphy as Lt. Don Parker
 Peter Berg as Jonathan Parker
 Camille Cooper as Alison Clemens
 Mitch Pileggi as Horace Pinker
 Sam Scarber as Sidney Cooper
 Richard Brooks as Rhino
 Vincent Guasteferro as Pastori
 Ted Raimi as Pac Man
 Heather Langenkamp as Victim: Langenkamp previously portrayed the heroine Nancy Thompson in Craven's landmark films, A Nightmare on Elm Street (1984) and A Nightmare on Elm Street 3: Dream Warriors (1987). In this film, she makes a brief cameo appearance as Horace Pinker's first victim shown on TV news.
 Timothy Leary as the television evangelist
 Kane Roberts as Road Worker: The guitarist from Alice Cooper's band.
 Wes Craven as Man Neighbor
 Jessica Craven (Wes Craven's daughter) as Counterperson
 Jonathan Craven (Wes Craven's son) as Jogger. Jonathan also worked as the film's visual effects coordinator.
 John Tesh as the TV newscaster
 Michael Matthews as Evil Mouth
 Eugene Chadbourne as Man in Bar

Release

Rating
According to Craven, the film was severely cut for an "R" rating. It took around thirteen submissions to the Motion Picture Association of America to receive an "R" instead of an "X". Some scenes that were cut included Pinker spitting out fingers that he bit off of a prison guard, a longer and more graphic electrocution of Pinker, and a longer scene of a possessed coach stabbing his own hand. Despite fan interest, an uncut version has never been released.

Box office
Shocker was released on October 27, 1989 in 1,783 venues.  It earned $4,510,990 in its opening weekend, ranking second behind the third weekend of Look Who's Talking. The film ultimately grossed $16.6 million in the United States.

Critical response
The film received a split vote from Gene Siskel and Roger Ebert on their weekly television show, with Siskel giving it "a marginal thumbs up" but Ebert voting "thumbs down" and explaining "I felt it would have been a better movie if it had played with more rules." Stephen Holden of The New York Times wrote, "If the movie's metaphors are as obvious and as portentous as the heavy metal music that punctuates the action, 'Shocker' at least has the feel of a movie that was fun to make. Just when you think that every trick has been thrown in but the kitchen sink, it goes in too, along with stove and the refrigerator." Variety wrote, "At first glance (or at least for the first 40 minutes) 'Shocker' seems a potential winner, an almost unbearably suspenseful, stylish and blood-drenched ride courtesy of writer-director Craven's flair for action and sick humor. As it continues, however, the camp aspects simply give way to the ridiculous while failing to establish any rules to govern the mayhem. The result is plenty of unintentional laughs that undermine the few legitimate chuckles and most of the remaining action." Michael Wilmington of the Los Angeles Times stated that the film "is crammed with dazzling bursts of macabre technique" but "is so diffusely organized it's almost three separate movies." Johanna Steinmetz of the Chicago Tribune gave the film one-and-a-half stars out of four and wrote, "A gory thrill show for underdeveloped sensibilities, it is sloppily organized and jarringly paced. Its single conceit, that a barrage of television programs has weakened both our values and our grasp of realities, while an excuse for a climax of ingenious special effects, can't sustain an entire movie." Richard Harrington of The Washington Post said, "For the longest time, 'Shocker' is low voltage, just another gathering of slasher cliches. Toward the end, though, it comes to life thanks to an extended special effects package that is only hinted at earlier." Kim Newman wrote in The Monthly Film Bulletin that "all the characters, especially the dumb-hunk hero and his dead but chatty girlfriend, are cardboard, and none of the connective tissue makes any sense. Asked to turn out 'another Nightmare on Elm Street, Craven has sadly resorted to facile self-imitation rather than coming up with something as fiercely original as his biggest hit movie."

In Wes Craven: The Art of Horror, John Kenneth Muir described Shocker as "Craven's response to the Freddy Krueger film series" for Universal.  Muir describes several similarities between the series, though he says Shocker is more comedic.  Of the film's conclusion, Muir wrote, Shocker'''s final 20 minutes are a stylistic special effects tour de force and well worth the price of admission." As of July 2022, the film holds a 26% rating on Rotten Tomatoes based on 23 reviews. The site's consensus reads: "With an intriguing enough premise and horror legend Wes Craven on writer-director duty, the real Shocker here is just how lame the end results turned out to be".

Later Wes Craven said: “I’d like to redo Shocker just to get the special effects right because we had a real special effects disaster on the film. The guy who was doing all the visual effects kind of flamed out, had a nervous breakdown because he was attempting more than he could actually do. When he told us towards the end of the movie that not a single one of the special effects was actually working, he was working on a new technique, my son’s job specifically became just to find all the negative. It was all around town in unmarked boxes and under people’s editing [benches]. It was a nightmare itself. We pulled every favor in town to get all those special effects done very quickly, and some of them are pretty sketchy.”

Metacritic scored Shocker 51 out of 100, indicating "mixed or average reviews".

Home media
The film was released on DVD by Universal Studios in 1999. It was subsequently re-released by the studio in 2007 as a double feature, alongside Craven's The People Under the Stairs. The film's first Blu-ray edition was released by Shout! Factory on September 8, 2015.

 Literature Shocker received a novelization written by Randall Boyll in 1990.

 Video Games 
Horace P. Gauge is a main antagonist in the video "The Suffering" released in 2004. His name and fate are a direct reference to the shocker.  
Music

Original musical contributions included songs by Alice Cooper (who would later play Freddy Krueger's abusive foster father, Mr. Underwood, in Freddy's Dead: The Final Nightmare'') and Megadeth, who covered Alice Cooper's 1973 hit "No More Mr. Nice Guy", among others. The movie's title song was written by Jean Beauvoir and Desmond Child and recorded by The Dudes of Wrath, a supergroup composed of Paul Stanley of Kiss and Desmond Child, both on vocals, Vivian Campbell and Guy Mann-Dude on guitars, Whitesnake's Rudy Sarzo on bass guitar, and Mötley Crüe's Tommy Lee on drums. The band also included backing vocals by Van Halen bassist Michael Anthony and Kane Roberts. The soundtrack was released on Capitol/SBK
Records in 1989.

References

External links
 
 
 

1989 films
1989 horror films
1989 independent films
1980s slasher films
American slasher films
American independent films
American serial killer films
American supernatural horror films
Carolco Pictures films
Films about capital punishment
Films about television
Films directed by Wes Craven
Films set in Ohio
Supernatural slasher films
Universal Pictures films
TriStar Pictures films
1980s English-language films
1980s American films